Laros Duarte (born 28 February 1997) is a Dutch professional football player who plays as a midfielder for Groningen.

Club career
He made his debut for Eerste Divisie side Jong PSV in 2015. In the 2015–16 season, the footballer joined PSV. He used to play for Sparta Rotterdam from Rotterdam before he moved to Eindhoven.

On 31 August 2021, he signed a four-year contract with Groningen.

Personal life
He is the older brother of Deroy Duarte.

References

External links
Profile at PSV
 Career stats & profile - Voetbal International

1997 births
Living people
Footballers from Rotterdam
Dutch sportspeople of Cape Verdean descent
Association football midfielders
Dutch footballers
Netherlands youth international footballers
Jong PSV players
Sparta Rotterdam players
FC Groningen players
Eredivisie players
Eerste Divisie players